SMS S20 was a V1-class torpedo boat of the Imperial German Navy. The ship was built by Schichau-Werke, at their Elbing shipyard, completing in 1913. S20 served with the German High Seas Fleet during the First World War, taking part in the Battle of Jutland in 1916 and moved to Flanders later in 1916. The ship was sunk by cruisers and destroyers of the British Harwich Force on 5 June 1917.

Construction and design
In 1911, the Imperial German Navy decided to break the pattern of each year's orders of torpedo boats being a development of the previous year's designs, as it felt that they were getting too big to work for the fleet, and instead the 12 torpedo boats (six each ordered from AG Vulcan and Germaniawerft) (the ) were smaller than those ordered in recent years in order to be more manoeuvrable and so work better with the fleet. This change resulted in the numbering series for torpedo boats being restarted. The 1912 programme placed orders for a flotilla of 12 torpedo boats of similar design ( to ) with Schichau-Werke. The reduction in size resulted in the ships' seaworthiness being adversely affected, however, and range being reduced, with the 1911 and 1912 torpedo boats acquiring the disparaging nickname "Admiral Lans' cripples".

S20s armament consisted of two  SK L/30 naval guns in single mounts fore and aft, together with four 50 cm (19.7 in) torpedo tubes with one reload torpedo carried. Up to 18 mines could be carried. The ship had a crew of 74 officers and other ranks. In 1916, the guns were replaced by more powerful 8.8 cm SK L/45 naval guns, and in 1917 the ship was again rearmed, with two 10.5 cm SK L/45 naval guns replacing the 8.8cm guns, with the ship's forecastle being lengthened in 1916–17.

S20, yard number 871, was launched at Schichau's shipyard in Elbing, East Prussia (now Elbląg in Poland) on 4 December 1912 and was commissioned on 1 November 1913.

Service
In May 1914, S20 was a member of the 14th half-flotilla of the 7th Torpedo boat Flotilla, and remained part of the 14th half-flotilla at the outbreak of the First World War in August 1914. The 7th Torpedo Boat Flotilla supported the Raid on Yarmouth on 3 November 1914 and the Raid on Scarborough, Hartlepool and Whitby on 16 December 1914.  The flotilla continued to support the High Seas Fleet in 1915, sortieing into the German Bight with the 5th and 9th Flotilla on 19/20 January and escorting a sortie of the fleet's battleships to off Terschelling on 29/30 March. In May 1915, in support of the Gorlice–Tarnów offensive on the Eastern Front, Germany launched an attack against Libau (now Liepāja) in Latvia, with naval support from the German navy. The 14th half-flotilla, including S20, formed part of a force of four light cruisers and 21 torpedo boats detached from the High Seas Fleet in support of the Baltic operations. They were used to prevent interference by the Russian navy with the operations, patrolling between Ösel and Gotska Sandön and between Gotska Sandön and the Swedish coast. S20 and sister ship  operated in support of the light cruisers of IV Scouting Group on 7 May, and on 8 May, S20 and S23 were attacked by the British submarine , with S20 spotting the submarine's conning tower, but dense fog caused contact to be lost before S20 could open fire. The force detached from the High Seas Fleet was recalled to the North Sea soon after Libau was captured on 8 May.

S20, as part of the 7th flotilla, was part of the High Seas Fleet when it sailed to cover the Lowestoft Raid on 24–25 April 1916. At the Battle of Jutland on 31 May–1 June 1916, S17 was still part of the 13th Half-flotilla of the 7th Torpedo boat flotilla, operating in support of the main German battle fleet. During the night action, the 7th flotilla was ordered to search for and attack the British fleet, being allocated the sector to the south-east of the German fleet. As the British fleet had a night cruising speed of 17 knots, this would limit the 7th Flotilla's effectiveness.

In February 1917, S20 was one of six large torpedo boat and four small A-II-class torpedo boats that were ordered to reinforce the German naval forces based in Flanders. The ten torpedo boats arrived at Zeebrugge on 18 February 1917, with S20 joining the 2nd Zeebrugge half-flotilla. On 25 February 1917, Admiral Ludwig von Schröder, commander of German naval forces in Flanders, took advantage of the increased strength of the Flanders-based surface forces to order an attack against shipping in the English Channel and southern North Sea. The operation was not a success, with no shipping encountered. On the night of 17/18 March, a second attack on the Channel was launched. S20, with three other ships of the 2nd Zeebrugge half-flotilla (S15, S18 and S24), were ordered to attack shipping in the Downs, while two other groups of torpedo boats attacked the Dover Barrage patrols. The Zeebrugge half-flotilla fired on one of the drifters guarding the entrance to the Downs, Paramount as they entered the Downs, and then found a single merchant ship, the steamer , which was at anchor because it was suffering from engine problems and unable to follow standing orders to find a safer anchorage. S20 sank Greypoint before the group again clashed with the drifters guarding the downs, damaging the Redwald and briefly shelling coastal targets in Kent before withdrawing. The other groups sank the British destroyer  and damaged the destroyer .

The next raid on the Channel was on the night of 20/21 April, when S20 was one of 15 torpedo boats to be sent out in three groups. On the night of 26/27 April, S20 took part in a raid by 15 Flanders-based torpedo boats in 3 groups with the intention of attacking shipping off the Thames Estuary. No shipping was found, and instead Margate, Broadstairs and Ramsgate were shelled, killing two people, wounding three more and damaging several houses.

In the early morning of 5 June, S20 and S15 were returning from a patrol when they encountered four light cruisers (and ), the destroyer leader  and eight destroyers of the Harwich Force, which were providing cover for a bombardment of Ostend by monitors of the Dover Patrol. Heavily outnumbered and outgunned, the two German torpedo boats made for Zeebrugge and the protection of German coastal defences. A division of four British destroyers (and ) were ordered to pursue the torpedo boats. S20 was hit in the boiler room by one of the cruisers, immobilising S20 and killing her captain. The British destroyers sank S20, with 49 of her crew killed. S15, although hit three times, managed to make the cover of the coastal defences, causing the British to break off the pursuit.

The Nazi German destroyer Erich Giese was named after S20s commanding officer killed during S20s loss.

Notes

References

Bibliography
 
 
 
 
 
 
 
 
 
 
 
 
 
 
 
 

Torpedo boats of the Imperial German Navy
1912 ships
World War I torpedo boats of Germany
V1-class destroyers
Ships built in Elbing
Ships built by Schichau